CCGS Sir Wilfrid Laurier is a  light icebreaker and major navaids tender of the Canadian Coast Guard. Built in 1986 by Canadian Shipbuilding at Collingwood, Ontario, Canada, she was the last ship constructed there. The ship has been based out of Victoria, British Columbia.

Description and design

The vessel is propelled by two fixed-pitch propellers and bow thrusters powered by three Alco 251F diesel-electric engines creating  and three Canadian GE generators producing 6 megawatts of AC power driving two Canadian GE motors creating . The ship is also equipped with one Caterpillar 3306 emergency generator. The ship is certified as Arctic Class 2.

The icebreaker is equipped with one Racal Decca Bridgemaster navigational radar operating on the I band. The vessel has a  cargo hold. Sir Wilfrid Laurier has a flight deck and hangar which originally accommodated light helicopters of the MBB Bo 105 or Bell 206L types, but in the 2010s, the Bell 429 GlobalRanger and Bell 412EPI were acquired by the Canadian Coast Guard to replace the older helicopters. The ship has a complement of 27, with 10 officers and 17 crew. Sir Wilfrid Laurier has 26 additional berths.

Workboat/lifeboat
Sir Wilfrid Lauriers workboat/lifeboat No. 1 was re-purposed as a training boat/work boat that has been operated by the Maritime Affairs Committee Navy League of Canada – Outaouais Branch since 1995. Fred Gordon was a member of the Hull Legion who supported the Royal Canadian Navy Sea Cadet Corps la Hulloise (CCMRC No. 230) sponsored by the Outaouais Branch of the Navy League of Canada.

Operational history
The ship was constructed by Canadian Shipbuilding at their yard in Collingwood, Ontario with the yard number 230. Named for a former prime minister of Canada, Sir Wilfrid Laurier was launched on 6 December 1985 and entered service on 15 November 1986. The ship is registered in Ottawa, Ontario, and homeported at Victoria, British Columbia. The ship was initially assigned to the Laurentian Region, but transferred to the Western Region.

Sir Wilfrid Laurier is a multi-tasked vessel which carries out a wide variety of Coast Guard programs including buoy tending, search and rescue, science work, lightstation re-supply, beacon maintenance, radio repeater site maintenance, and icebreaking/escorting, aids to navigation and science work during summer patrols in the Arctic.

The vessel has been employed on research voyages and the rescue of survivors of the car ferry . Erebus was found on that expedition. In 2016, Sir Wilfrid Laurier, accompanied by the Royal Canadian Navy vessel , carried archaeologists to the site for further research. The two vessels also continued the search for Terror.

References

Notes

Citations

Sources

 
 

Martha L. Black-class icebreakers
1986 ships
Ships built in Collingwood, Ontario